A coronary occlusion is the partial or complete obstruction of blood flow in a coronary artery. This condition may cause a heart attack.

In some patients coronary occlusion causes only mild pain, tightness or vague discomfort which may be ignored; however, the myocardium, the muscle tissue of the heart, may be damaged.

In history 
According to Robert K. Massie's Nicholas and Alexandra: The Fall of the Romanov Dynasty, Tsar Nicholas II may have suffered a coronary occlusion right before he was toppled from his throne during the Russian Revolution in 1917.

See also
 Arterial embolism

References

Heart diseases